The 1980 Hamilton Tiger-Cats season was the 23rd season for the team in the Canadian Football League and their 31st overall. The Tiger-Cats finished in 1st place in the Eastern Conference with an 8–7–1 record. They appeared in the 68th Grey Cup game, but lost to the Edmonton Eskimos, who won their third straight championship.

Preseason

Regular season

Season Standings

Season schedule

Postseason

Schedule

Grey Cup

Awards and honours

1980 CFL All-Stars
Bernie Ruoff, Punter
David Shaw, Defensive back
Ben Zambiasi, Linebacker

References

Hamilton Tiger-cats Season, 1980
Hamilton Tiger-Cats seasons
James S. Dixon Trophy championship seasons
1980 Canadian Football League season by team